Emmanuel Trégoat (born 26 September 1962) is a French professional football manager.

Since July 2013 until June 2014 he was a coach of the Paris FC II. Since March 2014 he coaches the Chad national football team.

References

External links

 Emmanuel Trégoat Interview

1962 births
Living people
French football managers
Expatriate football managers in Chad
Chad national football team managers
Place of birth missing (living people)
Wasquehal Football managers
French expatriate football managers
French expatriate sportspeople in Chad